Iona Mary Campbell, Dowager Duchess of Argyll (née Colquhoun; born 22 June 1945) is a Scottish noblewoman. She was married to the 12th Duke of Argyll from 1964 until his death in 2001.

Biography
Iona Mary Colquhoun was born in 1945 in Edinburgh, the second child and only daughter of Ivar Colquhoun, 8th Baronet of Luss, and his wife, Kathleen (née Duncan). She had two brothers, Torquhil and Malcolm. 

On 4 July 1964, she married Ian Campbell, the then-Marquess of Lorne, at St Giles' Cathedral in Edinburgh. They had two children:
 Torquhil Ian Campbell, 13th Duke of Argyll (born 1968). Married to Eleanor Cadbury on 8 June 2002 at St Mary's Church, Fairford. Their children are:
 Archie Frederick Campbell, Marquess of Lorne (born 2004)
 Lord Rory James Campbell (born 2006)
 Lady Charlotte Mary Campbell (born 2008)
 Lady Louise Iona Campbell (born 1972). Married to Anthony Merrik Burrell on 18 April 1998 at St Giles' Cathedral. Their children are:
 Teale Iona Burrell (born 11 February 2005)
 Albert Westray Burrell (born 4 February 2009)

Campbell and her daughter-in-law are patronesses of the Royal Caledonian Ball.

References

Living people
1945 births
Argyll
Clan Campbell
Nobility from Edinburgh
Duchesses of Argyll
Daughters of baronets